Themata is the debut full-length album by the Australian progressive rock band Karnivool. The album was released independently on 7 February 2005, and was distributed via MGM Distribution. The album was released in the United States on 10 April 2007 via Bieler Bros. Records and in the UK on 7 May 2008 on the Happy Go Lucky label.

The album was well received in Australia, with Kerrang! Magazine describing it as "a ten-track journey of soaring melody". Three singles were released from the album, "L1FEL1KE" in 2003, "Themata" and "Shutterspeed", both in 2005.

Background
Guitarist Drew Goddard wrote all of the album's songs and performed drums on every track, except for "L1fel1ke".

"Roquefort" was initially supposed to be recorded with a horns section, but the band did not have time to do this during the recording of the album. Harry Angus and Kieran Conrau of the Cat Empire later recorded trumpet and trombone respectively for the single version of "Roquefort".  This version has been played live on a few occasions, including at Rock-It 2005, during the Triple J Hottest 100 on 26 January 2007, and at the 2010 Melbourne Big Day Out.Drew Goddard said the following regarding "Change", stating "'Change' wasn’t originally conceived as a two part song.We had written about 60% of "Change" as a whole piece and were desperately trying to finish it in preproduction for inclusion on Themata, as we thought it was shaping up to be an absolute cracker. Due to the nature of the song, the time needed to spend on it and the time we didn’t have we decided do the thing that annoyed everyone so much, and chop it at the peak of the climax, and then finish the 2nd part for inclusion the next album. The title "Change" seemed fitting as this was the last song (mostly) written during the Themata sessions and almost signaled what we thought could be a change of direction on the next album.… It seems we were pretty spot on going by the general feel of the new material. It just wouldn’t have found its place on Themata.

Track listing

Charts
Themata debuted on the ARIA top 50 in June 2015.

Certifications

Release details

Personnel
Karnivool
 Ian Kenny – lead vocals
 Drew Goddard – guitar, drums, backing vocals, string arrangements 
 Mark Hosking – guitar, backing vocals
 Jon Stockman – bass

Additional
 Ray Hawkins – drums on track 6
 Novac Bull – additional vocals on track 2
 Leigh Miller – string arrangements on track 2
 Eve Silver – string arrangements on track 8
 Ezekiel Ox – whistling and castanets on track 5

References

2005 debut albums
Karnivool albums
Bieler Bros. Records albums